Biesiekierz   is a village in Koszalin County, West Pomeranian Voivodeship, in north-western Poland. It is the seat of the gmina (administrative district) called Gmina Biesiekierz.

The village has a population of 940.

References

Biesiekierz